Carlo Cavagnoli (January 21, 1907 in Milan – 1991) was an Italian boxer who competed in the 1928 Summer Olympics.

In 1928 he won the bronze medal in the flyweight class after winning the third-place bout against Baddie Lebanon of South Africa.

1928 Olympic results
Below is the record of Carlo Cavagnoli, an Italian flyweight boxer  who competed at the 1928 Amsterdam Olympics:

 Round of 16: defeated Marcel Sartos (Belgium) on points
 Quarterfinal: defeated Alfredo Gaona (Mexico) on points
 Semifinal: lost to Antal Kocsis (Hungary) on points
 Bronze Medal Bout: defeated Baddie Lebanon (South Africa) on points (was awarded bronze medal)

References
 profile

1907 births
1991 deaths
Boxers from Milan
Flyweight boxers
Olympic boxers of Italy
Boxers at the 1928 Summer Olympics
Olympic bronze medalists for Italy
Olympic medalists in boxing
Italian male boxers
Medalists at the 1928 Summer Olympics